Trachylepis bayonii, also known commonly as Bayão's skink, Bayon's mabuya, and Bayon's skink, is a species of lizard in the family Scincidae. The species is endemic to Africa. There are two subspecies.

Etymology
The specific name, bayonii, is in honor of Francisco Antonio Pinheiro Bayão, who was a Portuguese planter in Angola.

Geographic range
T. bayonii is found in Angola, Kenya, Tanzania, and Uganda.

Habitat

Reproduction
T. bayonii is viviparous.

Subspecies
Two subspecies are recognized as being valid, including the nominotypical subspecies.
Trachylepis bayonii bayonii 
Trachylepis bayonii keniensis 

Nota bene: A trinomial authority in parentheses indicates that the subspecies was originally described in a genus other than Trachylepis.

References

Further reading
Bocage JV (1872). "Diagnoses de quelques espèces nouvelles de Reptiles d'Afrique occidentale ". Jornal de Sciencias Mathematicas, Physicas e Naturaes, Academia Real de Sciencias de Lisboa 4: 72–82. (Euprepes bayonii, new species, p. 75). (in French).
Boulenger GA (1887). Catalogue of the Lizards in the British Museum (Natural History). Second Edition. Volume III. ... Scincidæ ... London: Trustees of the British Museum (Natural History). (Taylor and Francis, printers). xii + 575 pp. + Plates I-XL. (Mabuia bayonii, new combination, p. 201).
Laurent RF (1964). "Reptiles et batraciens de l'Angola (troisième note) ". Companhia de Diamantes de Angola (Diamang), Serviços Culturais, Museu do Dundo (Angola) (67): 165. (Mabuya bayonii huilensis, new subspecies). (in French).
Loveridge A (1956). "A New Subgenus of Chamaeleo from Rhodesia and a New Race of Mabuya from Kenya Colony". Breviora (59): 1–4. (Mabuya bayonii keniensis, new subspecies, pp. 2–4).

Trachylepis
Reptiles of Tanzania
Reptiles of Angola
Reptiles of Kenya
Reptiles of Uganda
Reptiles described in 1872
Taxa named by José Vicente Barbosa du Bocage